Dixie Wanda Hendrix (November 3, 1928 – February 1, 1981) was an American film and television actress.

Early life
Hendrix's father was a logging foreman, and she was born in Jacksonville, Florida. She was performing in a school play in Jacksonville when she was seen by a talent agent who took her to Warner Bros. Her parents moved with her to California, buying a ranch there. She graduated from University High School.

Career and marriages
She made her first film, Confidential Agent, in 1945 at the age of 16, and for the first few years of her career was consistently cast in B movies. By the late 1940s, she was being included in more prestigious films, such as Ride the Pink Horse (1947) and Miss Tatlock's Millions (1948). She starred with Tyrone Power in Prince of Foxes (1949).

Hendrix resumed her career but found it difficult to obtain good roles. On June 26, 1954, she married wealthy sportsman James Langford Stack, Jr., the brother of actor Robert Stack, and essentially retired from films, though she worked in live television dramatic anthology shows such as Pulitzer Prize Playhouse, Robert Montgomery Presents, The Plymouth Playhouse, The Ford Television Theatre, The Revlon Mirror Theater, and Schlitz Playhouse, and occasionally appeared in later series such as Bat Masterson, My Three Sons, Wagon Train and Bewitched. She and Stack divorced on November 3, 1958. She married Italian financier and oil company executive Steven LaMonte on June 7, 1969; they divorced on November 17, 1980.

Death
Hendrix died on February 1, 1981, in Burbank, California from double pneumonia, aged 52, and was interred at Forest Lawn Cemetery.

Partial filmography

Confidential Agent (1945) as Else
Nora Prentiss (1947) as Bonita Talbot
Welcome Stranger (1947) as Emily Walters
Hollywood Wonderland (1947 short) as Tour Guide (uncredited)
Variety Girl (1947) (uncredited)
Ride the Pink Horse (1947) as Pila
My Own True Love (1948) as Sheila Heath
Miss Tatlock's Millions (1948) as Nan Tatlock
Song of Surrender (1949) as Abigail Hunt
Prince of Foxes (1949) as Camilla
Captain Carey, U.S.A. (1950) as Giulia [de Cresci] de Greffi
Sierra (1950) as Riley Martin
The Admiral Was a Lady (1950) as Jean Madison
Saddle Tramp (1950) as Della
The Highwayman (1951) as Bess Forsythe
My Outlaw Brother (1951) as Señorita Carmelita Alvarado
Montana Territory (1952) as Clair Enoch
South of Algiers (1953) as Anne Burnet
The Last Posse (1953) as Deborah Morley
Sea of Lost Ships (1953) as Pat Kirby
Highway Dragnet (1954) as Susan
The Black Dakotas (1954) as Ruth Lawrence
The Boy Who Caught a Crook (1961) as Laura
Johnny Cool (1963) as Miss Connolly
Stage to Thunder Rock (1964) as Mrs. Swope
 The Oval Portrait (1972) as Lisa Buckingham

References

External links

Wanda Hendrix at Glamour Girls of the Silver Screen

American film actresses
American television actresses
Actresses from Jacksonville, Florida
Deaths from pneumonia in California
1928 births
1981 deaths
Burials at Forest Lawn Memorial Park (Hollywood Hills)
20th-century American actresses